From the Ecstasy is the full-length debut album from Brain Dead. Released only on cassette tape by Dark Journey Records in 1992. It was reissued in 2010 on CD and vinyl.

Track listing
All music and lyrics by Brain Dead.

"Unholy Sins" - 5:03
"Twisted Soul" - 4:46
"Sacred" - 6:53
"Repulse To Destruct" - 5:34
"From The Ecstasy" - 4:59
"Impious Mortal" - 5:15
"Eternal War" - 5:03
"Rites Of The Tyrant" - 8:58

Band members
Ein Possessor - vocals and guitar
Malek - guitar
Hashim Pestilence - bass and drums

1992 albums
Brain Dead (band) albums